Koprišnica Falls is located near the uninhabited village of Koprišnica in the Municipality of Demir Kapija in North Macedonia.  The waterfall is formed from the waters of the Doznica River. Additional waterfalls can also be found higher in the mountains around Demir Kapija. The waterfall is known for its high mercury content.

Waterfalls of North Macedonia
Demir Kapija Municipality